Chanmyr Udumbara (20 April 1948 – 14 November 2021) was a Russian statesman and politician. He served on the Federation Council from 24 December 2001 to 8 October 2002.

References

1948 births
2021 deaths
Tuvan people
21st-century Russian politicians
Federation Council (Russia)